The Greens - Solidarity are a Greek political party that supports the principles of political ecology. Founded by MEP Nikos Chrysogelos after his retirement from the party of Ecologist Greens.

The Party's founding purpose was their participation in the 2014 European Parliament election.

On 4 January 2015 it was announced that the party would cooperate with the Democratic Left in the January 2015 legislative election under the name "Greens - Democratic Left."

References

Green political parties in Greece
2014 establishments in Greece
Political parties established in 2014
2014 in Greek politics